Victim Support is an independent charity in England and Wales that provides specialist practical and emotional support to victims and witnesses of crime.

Activities
Support for victims of crime Trained volunteers and employees offer free and confidential practical and emotional support to victims and witnesses of crime. In 2017, the charity had contact with over 800,000 victims of crime across England and Wales to offer information and support. As well as emotional support the charity provides victims with practical help, such as making their home secure after a burglary, applying for compensation, help with re-housing or accessing mental health and other specialised services through the NHS.
Supportline A free 24/7 telephone helpline offering confidential support and advice to anyone affected by crime in England and Wales - 08 08 16 89 111.
Specialist services
The national Homicide Service, helping families in England and Wales who've been bereaved by murder or manslaughter
Local services helping victims of any crime, including domestic or sexual violence, anti-social behaviour and hate crime
Local services for young victims of crime, including specialist support for children who have experienced domestic abuse, sexual assault and grooming
Restorative justice programmes
Research Victim Support's research team look into the issues facing victims of crime and make recommendations, based on evidence, on how to tackle those problems to government. police, criminal justice and other organisations.
Fundraising The charity is funded by public donations along with funding awards made by grant-making bodies and services commissioned by Police and Crime Commissioners.
Volunteering Volunteers are trained to work directly with victims and witnesses of crime or to be a fundraiser.

History
Victims' services The first Victim Support scheme was set up in Bristol in 1974. The charity's founders included staff from the National Association for the Care and Resettlement of Offenders (now NACRO), the police and probation services. By 1986, every county in England and Wales had at least one Victim Support scheme. Victim Support registered as a charitable company in 1987 and in 2008, all local services merged to create a single national federation in England and Wales.

Homicide Service Since 1985, the charity has run the Homicide Service, supporting people bereaved by murder or manslaughter.

Witness Service The charity set up the national Witness Service in 1989 and supported its development to cover both all Crown Court centres and all the magistrates' courts in England and Wales. The Witness Service was run by Victim Support until April 2015.

Supportline In 1998, Victim Support's free national telephone helpline for victims and witnesses was established. Since the 2017 Westminster attack and the other terrorist attacks that year, the Supportline has been provided 24/7.

Officials
Chair: Andrew Tivey
Chief Executive Officer: Diana Fawcett

Notable Former Officials
Former Chief Executive: Dame Helen Reeves DBE. Dame Helen served the charity for 26 years, retiring in 2005. Other notable figures who helped Victim Support become a major force for victims in the early years include: Kathy Hobdell MBE, Ron Chick MBE, Sue Tomson, Kay Coventry, Sarah Cawthra, Jane Cooper, Martin Wright and John Pointing.

Research reports
"Survivor's Justice", December 2017
"Responding to terror attacks", November 2017
"Victim of the System", April 2017
"Understanding Victims of Crime", April 2017
"VS Insight Report: An Easy Target? Risk factors affecting victimisation rates for violent crime and theft", April 2016
 "Waiting for Justice: How victims of crime are waiting longer than ever for criminal trials", June 2015
 "Suffering in silence: children and unreported crime", December 2014
"At risk, yet dismissed: the criminal victimisation of people with mental health problems" Report, October 2014
Summary
"Left in the dark – why victims of crime need to be kept informed", July 2011. 
"Criminal neglect: no justice beyond criminal justice", 2002
Rights for Victims of Crime, 1995

References

External links
 

1974 establishments in the United Kingdom
British victims of crime
Charities based in London
Crime in England
Crime in Wales
Organisations based in the City of Westminster
Organizations established in 1974
Operation Yewtree